Zolantidine is a brain-penetrating selective histamine H2 receptor (HRH2) antagonist developed by Smith, Kline & French, with the research code of SK&F 95282. It is a benzothiazole derivative with a 30-fold higher potency for H2 receptors than other peripheral and central receptors.

References 

Benzothiazoles
H2 receptor antagonists
Phenol ethers
1-Piperidinyl compounds